Pinnilavu is a 1983 Indian Malayalam-language drama film directed by P. G. Viswambharan and written by Thoppil Bhasi, based on the story of the same name by C. Radhakrishnan. It stars Madhu, Srividya, Mammootty, Mohanlal, Poornima Bhagyaraj, M G Soman, Mukesh, Maniyan Pillai Raju, and Sukumari. The music was composed by Ilaiyaraaja. The film is about a fight of ethics between a father and son.

Plot
Kesava Panickar is an honest government engineer who assiduously resists any offers of bribes. His only son Govindanunni gets selected for MBBS, for which Panicker is too proud of. Unni is in love with Parvathi, and their marriage is almost fixed by both the parents. But changes are seen in Unni after he joins the college. Getting into bad company consisting of spoiled brats from rich families, Unni turns to alcohol, grass and porn, and stops attending his classes.

Raghu, the son of Padnanabhan Pillai, a corrupted contractor, their leader manipulates Unni by all means. Unni starts taking bribes on his father's behalf and eventually culminates in stealing money from his own house. In the process, he alienates his father and gets thrown out of home. He finds accommodation with his college mates at the "house of sin". Later he finds it difficult to stay there as his friends began avoiding him when he was not able to  pay them his part of the house rent.

Meanwhile, he is frequently visited by Parvathi, his cousin and lover. Parvathi was able to make him realise his faults, but even she is not able to unite him with his father. Afterwards, Unni fixes his marriage with  Parvathi, without the consent of his father. At the wedding, Dr. Gopi, a family friend who financially supported Unni makes Unni realize his mistake. He reaches his father to apologize, but finds his father dead.

Cast
 Mammootty as Govindhananunni a.k.a. Unni
 Poornima Jayaram as Parvathi, Unni's cousin and lover
 Madhu as Kesava Panikkar
 Srividya as Sreedevi
 Mohanlal as Raghu, Pillai's son
 M. G. Soman as Doctor Gopi
 Mucherla Aruna as Gopi's Lover
 Maniyanpilla Raju as Sreedharan
 Mukesh as Sabu
 Vijayaraghavan as Wilson
 Santhosh as Basheer
 Sukumari as Saraswathi, Parvathi's mother
 Adoor Bhasi as Padmanabha Pillai

Songs
There are three songs in the film with lyrics by poet Yusuf Ali Kechery and music scored by Ilaiyaraaja.

"Maane Madhurakkarimbe" — K. J. Yesudas
"Nishaamanoharee " — K. J. Yesudas,P Jaychandran, S. Janaki
"Priyane Uyir Neeye " — K. J. Yesudas, S. Janaki

References

External links
 
 Pinnilavu at the Malayalam Movie Database

1980s Malayalam-language films
1983 films
Indian drama films
Films scored by Ilaiyaraaja
Films directed by P. G. Viswambharan